This is a list of notable events in country music that took place in the year 2011.

Events
 January 1 – Shania Twain marries Swiss businessman Frédéric Thiébaud in Puerto Rico, less than two weeks after announcing the two were engaged. Also on the same day, Kellie Pickler and songwriter Kyle Jacobs marry in the Caribbean.
 January 11 – Jewel confirms to People Magazine that she and her husband, Ty Murray, are expecting their first child together. On March 11, Jewel and her unborn baby were unharmed after a collision with a firetruck near her current hometown of Stephenville, Texas. Jewel would give birth to a son, Kase Townes Murray, on July 11.
 February 15 – Glen Campbell announces that he will release his final studio album in 2011 with a farewell concert tour to follow. He also is planning an acoustic-style greatest-hits album before officially retiring.
 March 18 – Billy Ray Cyrus confirms on The View that he has dropped his divorce and has begun to reconcile his family.
 March 27 – Shania Twain is inducted into the Canadian Music Hall of Fame during the Juno Awards. In a backstage interview, Twain confirms she is recording new music and preparing to go back on tour.
 April 19 – CMT and several other news sources confirm that actor Jeff Bridges has signed a recording contract with jazz music label Blue Note Records. He will collaborate with producer T-Bone Burnett and would release his debut album in 2011. Bridges previously won an Oscar for his portrayal of a country music singer-songwriter.
 May 14 – Blake Shelton and Miranda Lambert are married at Don Strange Ranch in Boerne, Texas, after five years of dating.
 May 23 – John Rich is selected as the winner of the fourth season of the Celebrity Apprentice over actress Marlee Matlin.
 May 25 – Scotty McCreery wins the tenth-season competition of American Idol, becoming the second country music-focused artist (behind Carrie Underwood) to win. Runner-up Lauren Alaina is also rooted in country music. Days later, both sign lucrative contracts with Mercury Nashville Records.
 June 4 – A house fire destroys the home of Trace Adkins and his family; his three youngest daughters and a dog, who were home when the fire started, escape safely.
 June 22 – Glen Campbell announces that he has Alzheimer's disease, having been diagnosed with the illness about six months prior. This news comes four months after Campbell announces his retirement from the music business.
 July 11 – Gloriana, a mixed quartet, announces the departure of Cheyenne Kimball. The group is reduced to a trio at this point.
 August 13 – Seven people are killed and more than 45 people are injured when an outdoor stage collapses at the Indiana State Fair due to high winds at a concert featuring Sugarland. Neither the duo nor their opening act, Sara Bareilles, were on stage at the time of the collapse.
 October 3 - Hank Williams Jr.'s opening theme for Monday Night Football, "All My Rowdy Friends Are Here on Monday Night", with its famous line, "Are you ready for some football?", is pulled from that night's program on ESPN, after Williams compared President Obama to Adolf Hitler on Fox & Friends. The song had been used in the show's opening broadcasts since 1989. The song would eventually return in 2017, with a remix featuring Florida Georgia Line and Jason Derulo.
 October 10 - Toby Keith releases "Red Solo Cup". The song becomes a major viral and crossover hit, with the music video acquiring more than 600,000 views on YouTube before the release of Keith's album Clancy's Tavern, and reaching #15 on the Billboard Hot 100 and #9 on the Hot Country Songs chart, as well as being covered in the Glee episode "Hold On to Sixteen" two months later.
  November 3 – Keith Urban announces that he will undergo throat surgery to remove a polyp in his vocal cords. He subsequently cancels or postpones all public appearances until 2012.

Top hits of the year
The following songs placed within the Top 20 on the Hot Country Songs or Canada Country charts in 2011:

Top new album releases
The following albums placed within the Top 50 on the Top Country Albums charts in 2011:

Other top albums

Deaths
 January 10 – Margaret Whiting, 86, female country and pop vocalist of the 1940s and early 1950s. (natural causes)
 January 19 – James O'Gwynn, 82, singer of the late 1950s and early 1960s, best known for his hit "My Name Is Mud."
 January 26 – Charlie Louvin, 83, singer/songwriter who teamed with brother Ira as The Louvin Brothers, and became a star in his own right after Ira's death. (pancreatic cancer)
 March 17 – Ferlin Husky, 85, singer/songwriter of the 1950s and 1960s who had hits with "Gone" and "Wings of a Dove." (congestive heart failure)
 March 30 – Harley Allen, 55, songwriter, writer of several country songs such as "The Baby" and "Awful, Beautiful Life." (lung cancer)
 March 31 – Mel McDaniel, 68, singer in the 1970s and 1980s who had a number one hit in 1985 with "Baby's Got Her Blue Jeans On." (cancer)
 July 29 – Jack Barlow, 87, singer of several hits in the 1960s such as "I Love Country Music" and "Catch the Wind."
 August 7 – Marshall Grant, 83, bassist of Johnny Cash's original backing duo, The Tennessee Two.
 August 10 – Billy Grammer, 85, Grand Ole Opry member best known for his hit "Gotta Travel On." (natural causes)
 September 12 – Don Wayne, 78, songwriter who wrote "Country Bumpkin." (cancer)
 September 13 – Wilma Lee Cooper, 90, Grand Ole Opry member. (natural causes)
 September 27 – Johnnie Wright, 97, singer/songwriter who was part of Johnnie and Jack and husband of Kitty Wells. (natural causes)
 September 27 – Johnny "Country" Mathis, 80, singer/songwriter and member of Jimmy & Johnny, but not confused to the pop crooner. (pneumonia)
 October 12 – Joel "Taz" DiGregorio, 67, keyboardist for The Charlie Daniels Band. (car accident)
 October 31 – Liz Anderson, 81, singer/songwriter wrote Merle Haggard's The Fugitive and is the mother of Lynn. (heart and lung disease)
 December 7 – Charlie Russell Canadian country music DJ best known for his 1975 album The Bricklin and Other Sound Investments
 December 14 – Billie Jo Spears, 74, singer of several major hits in the 1970s including the number one single "Blanket on the Ground" in 1975. (cancer)

Hall of Fame Inductees

Bluegrass Hall of Fame Inductees
Del McCoury
George Shuffler

Country Music Hall of Fame Inductees
Bobby Braddock
Reba McEntire
Jean Shepard

Canadian Country Music Hall of Fame Inductees
Bill Langstroth
Michelle Wright

Major awards

Academy of Country Music
(presented April 1, 2012 in Las Vegas, Nevada)
Entertainer of the Year – Taylor Swift
Top Male Vocalist – Blake Shelton
Top Female Vocalist – Miranda Lambert
Top Vocal Group – Lady Antebellum
Top Vocal Duo – Thompson Square
Top New Artist – Scotty McCreery
Album of the Year – Four the Record, Miranda Lambert
Single Record of the Year – "Don't You Wanna Stay", Jason Aldean and Kelly Clarkson
Song of the Year – "Crazy Girl", Eli Young Band
Video of the Year – "Red Solo Cup", Toby Keith
Vocal Event of the Year – "Don't You Wanna Stay", Jason Aldean and Kelly Clarkson

ACM Honors
Career Achievement Award – Reba McEntire
Cliffie Stone Pioneer Award – Garth Brooks
Cliffie Stone Pioneer Award – Larry Gatlin
Jim Reeves International Award – Taylor Swift
Mae Boren Axton Award – John Dorris
Poet's Award – Hank Cochran
Poet's Award – Tom T. Hall
Tex Ritter Film Award – Country Strong

Americana Music Honors & Awards 
Album of the Year – Band of Joy (Robert Plant)
Artist of the Year – Buddy Miller
Duo/Group of the Year – The Avett Brothers
Song of the Year – "Harlem River Blues" (Justin Townes Earle)
Emerging Artist of the Year – Mumford & Sons
Instrumentalist of the Year – Buddy Miller
Lifetime Achievement: Trailblazer – Bob Harris
Lifetime Achievement: Songwriting – Lucinda Williams
Lifetime Achievement: Performance – Gregg Allman
Lifetime Achievement: Instrumentalist – Jerry Douglas
Lifetime Achievement: Executive – Rick Hall

American Music Awards 
(presented in Los Angeles on November 20, 2011)
Artist of the Year – Taylor Swift
Favorite Country Female Artist – Taylor Swift
 Favorite Country Male Artist – Blake Shelton
Favorite Country Band/Duo/Group – Lady Antebellum
Favorite Country Album – Speak Now by Taylor Swift

American Country Awards
(presented December 5 in Las Vegas, Nevada)

Artist of the Year – Jason Aldean
Female Artist of the Year – Carrie Underwood
Male Artist of the Year – Brad Paisley
Group/Duo of the Year – Lady Antebellum
Touring Artist of the Year – Jason Aldean
Album of the Year – My Kinda Party, Jason Aldean
Breakthrough Artist of the Year – Chris Young
New Artist of the Year – Scotty McCreery
Single of the Year – "Voices", Chris Young
Female Single of the Year – "Mama's Song", Carrie Underwood
Male Single of the Year – "My Kinda Party", Jason Aldean
Duo/Group Single of the Year – "Are You Gonna Kiss Me or Not", Thompson Square
Breakthrough Single of the Year – "Are You Gonna Kiss Me or Not", Thompson Square
Single by a Vocal Collaboration – "Don't You Wanna Stay", Jason Aldean feat. Kelly Clarkson
Music Video of the Year – "Who Are You When I'm Not Looking", Blake Shelton
Female Music Video of the Year – "Mama's Song", Carrie Underwood
Male Music Video of the Year – "Who Are You When I'm Not Looking", Blake Shelton
Duo/Group Music Video of the Year – "Don't You Wanna Stay", Jason Aldean feat. Kelly Clarkson
Breakthrough Music Video of the Year – "Are You Gonna Kiss Me or Not", Thompson Square

American Music Awards
(presented November 20 in Los Angeles)
Favorite Male Country Artist – Blake Shelton
Favorite Female Country Artist – Taylor Swift
Favorite Country Band/Duo/Group – Lady Antebellum
Favorite Country Album – Speak Now, Taylor Swift

ARIA Awards 
(presented in Sydney on November 27, 2011)
Best Country Album – Little Bird (Kasey Chambers)

Canadian Country Music Association
(presented September 12 in Hamilton)
Fans' Choice Award – Johnny Reid
Male Artist of the Year – Johnny Reid
Female Artist of the Year – Terri Clark
Group or Duo of the Year – Hey Romeo
Songwriter(s) of the Year – "Trail in Life", written by Dean Brody
Single of the Year – "Trail in Life", Dean Brody
Album of the Year – Trail in Life, Dean Brody
Top Selling Album – Speak Now, Taylor Swift
Top Selling Canadian Album – A Place Called Love, Johnny Reid
CMT Video of the Year – "Today I'm Gonna Try and Change the World", Johnny Reid
Rising Star Award – Chad Brownlee
Roots Artist or Group of the Year – Jimmy Rankin

Country Music Association
(presented November 9 in Nashville)
Single of the Year – "If I Die Young", The Band Perry
Song of the Year – "If I Die Young", Kimberly Perry
Vocal Group of the Year – Lady Antebellum
New Artist of the Year – The Band Perry
Album of the Year – My Kinda Party, Jason Aldean
Musician of the Year – Mac McAnally
Vocal Duo of the Year – Sugarland
Music Video of the Year – "You and Tequila", Kenny Chesney featuring Grace Potter
Male Vocalist of the Year – Blake Shelton
Female Vocalist of the Year – Miranda Lambert
Musical Event of the Year – "Don't You Wanna Stay", Jason Aldean with Kelly Clarkson
Entertainer of the Year – Taylor Swift

CMT Music Awards(presented June 8 in Nashville)Video of the Year – "Mine", Taylor Swift
Male Video of the Year – "Who Are You When I'm Not Looking", Blake Shelton
Female Video of the Year – "The House That Built Me", Miranda Lambert
Group Video of the Year – "Hello World", Lady Antebellum
Duo Video of the Year – "Stuck Like Glue", Sugarland
USA Weekend Breakthrough Video of the Year – "If I Die Young", The Band Perry
Collaborative Video of the Year – "That Should Be Me", Justin Bieber and Rascal Flatts
Performance of the Year – "Margaritaville", Jimmy Buffett featuring Zac Brown Band from CMT CrossroadsWeb Video of the Year – "Kiss My Country Ass", Blake Shelton
Video Director of the Year – Trey Fanjoy
Nationwide Is On Your Side Award – The Band Perry

CMT Artists of the Year
 (presented December 13 in Nashville)Jason Aldean
Kenny Chesney
Lady Antebellum
Brad Paisley
Taylor Swift

Grammy Awards(presented February 12, 2012)Best Country Solo Performance – "Mean", Taylor Swift
Best Country Duo/Group Performance – "Barton Hollow", The Civil Wars
Best Country Song – "Mean", Taylor Swift
Best Country Album – Own the Night, Lady Antebellum
Best Bluegrass Album – Paper Airplane, Alison Krauss & Union Station

Juno Awards(presented April 1, 2012 in Ottawa)Country Album of the Year – Roots and Wings'', Terri Clark

References

Other links
 Country Music Association
 Inductees of the Country Music Hall of Fame

Country
Country music by year